World Journal of Gastroenterology is a weekly peer-reviewed open access medical journal that covers research in gastroenterology. It was established in 1995 and is published by Baishideng Publishing Group, which was included on Beall's list of predatory publishers. The editor-in-chief is Andrzej S. Tarnawski (California State University, Long Beach).

Abstracting and indexing 
The journal is abstracted and indexed in:

In 2004, the journal was delisted from the Journal Citation Reports for excessive self-citation, but it was restored to this index in 2008, at which time its impact factor was determined to be 2.081. According to the Journal Citation Reports, the journal has a 2020 impact factor of 5.742, ranking it 28th out of 92 journals in the category "Gastroenterology and Hepatology".

References

External links 
 

Gastroenterology and hepatology journals
Weekly journals
English-language journals
Publications established in 1995
Baishideng Publishing Group academic journals